Cheshmeh-ye Zard or Cheshmeh Zard may refer to:
 Cheshmeh Zard, Razavi Khorasan
 Cheshmeh Zard, Nehbandan, South Khorasan
 Cheshmeh Zard, Shusef, South Khorasan